Brooks McKowen is an American college basketball coach, currently the head coach of the Peacocks at Upper Iowa University.

He had a successful career at Wapsie Valley High School in his hometown of Fairbank, Iowa, finishing as the state's all-time scoring leader and winning Iowa Mr. Basketball honors in 2003. McKowen then played basketball at Northern Iowa under Greg McDermott and Ben Jacobson. After his playing days were over, he stayed at Northern Iowa as a graduate assistant, then as a video coordinator. In 2010, he left and spent one season as an assistant coach at Des Moines Area Community College. Afterwards, he spent two seasons as an assistant coach at Southwest Minnesota State University under head coach Brad Bigler. While there, the Mustangs won their first ever Northern Sun men's basketball tournament championship in 2012.

In 2013, McKowen was hired as the head coach of the Upper Iowa Peacocks. Through seven seasons, the Peacocks have gone 114-93 (81-73 conference).

He was inducted into the IHSAA Basketball Hall of Fame as a member of its 2017 class.

Head Coaching Record

References

External links
 UNI Panthers bio

Year of birth missing (living people)
Living people
Basketball coaches from Iowa
Basketball players from Iowa
College men's basketball head coaches in the United States
Junior college men's basketball coaches in the United States
Northern Iowa Panthers men's basketball coaches
Northern Iowa Panthers men's basketball players
Southwest Minnesota State Mustangs men's basketball coaches
Upper Iowa Peacocks men's basketball coaches